Istanbul Blues Company (İstanbul Blues Kumpanyası in Turkish; referred as IBC hereafter) was a blues band from Turkey. They are often referred as The Original Turkish Blues Band and bring the blues sound to their national melodies, harvesting both to put together a unique and plausible sound. Despite being short-lived, the band was influential on both the Turkish blues scene and other bands.

History 
IBC was founded in October 1993 by Sarp Keskiner and Salih Nazım Peker as Constantinople Blues Company. They were inspired by blues collectives such as John Mayall & the Bluesbreakers and Alexis Korner's Blues Incorporated. Their first album, the thirteen-track Kökler, was released on tape in a batch of 3,000 in October 1996 and on CD in 1997. Keskiner directed, produced, composed, authored, and arranged this album before leaving in 1997. IBC released their second and final album, Sair Zamanlar, in 1999 before embarking on their last tour. The band dissolved in 2000.

In 2022, Bone Union Records released a 1997 recording of IRB playing at the Efes Pilsen Blues Festival.

Personnel

Founders
 Sarp Keskiner - vocals, guitar, harmonica, mandolin, washtub bass, banjo, foamboard, shaker, spoons, cans, clay bird flutes, tambourine, sticks
 Salih Nazım Peker - vocals, mandolin, banjo, baglama, darbouka

Collective
 Tuğrul Aray - harmonica, tenor saxophone, saxoflute, pipes, kaval
 İlhan Babaoglu - alto saxophone, bass vocals
 Orçun Baştürk - drums, bells, piano, conga, timbals, vocals, gongs
 Oya Erkaya - bass
 Erke Erokay - electric guitar, acoustic guitar
 Murat Ertel - FX guitar
 Burak Guven - bass
 Vefa Karatay - bass
 Suna Suner - vocals
 Ertan Tekin - zurna, mey, cura mey
 Erdem Tonguc - Farfisa organ, piano

See also
Music of Turkey
List of Turkish musicians

References

Blues musical groups
Turkish musical groups